Amblyseius crowleyi is a species of mite in the family Phytoseiidae.

References

crowleyi
Articles created by Qbugbot
Animals described in 2002